Negative elongation factor E is a protein that in humans is encoded by the RDBP gene.

Function 

The protein encoded by this gene is part of a complex termed negative elongation factor (NELF) which represses RNA polymerase II transcript elongation. This protein bears similarity to nuclear RNA-binding proteins; however, it has not been demonstrated that this protein binds RNA. The protein contains a tract of alternating basic and acidic residues, largely arginine (R) and aspartic acid (D). The gene localizes to the major histocompatibility complex (MHC class III) region on chromosome 6.

Interactions 

RDBP has been shown to interact with:
 Cofactor of BRCA1,
 TH1L,  and
 WHSC2.

References

Further reading

External links